William Hackblock (1805 – 2 January 1858) was a British Independent Liberal politician.

Hackblock was elected MP for Reigate in 1857, but died less than a year later, in 1858.

References

External links
 

Members of the Parliament of the United Kingdom for English constituencies
UK MPs 1857–1859
1805 births
1858 deaths